Sphaeroceridae are a family of true flies in the order Diptera, often called small dung flies, lesser dung flies or lesser corpse flies due to their saprophagous habits. They belong to the typical fly suborder Brachycera as can be seen by their short antennae, and more precisely they are members of the section Schizophora. There are over 1,300 species and about 125 genera accepted as valid today, but new taxa are still being described.

Unlike the large "corpse flies" or blow-flies of the family Calliphoridae and the large dung flies of the family Scathophagidae, the small dung flies are members of the schizophoran subsection Acalyptratae. Among their superfamily Sphaeroceroidea, they seem to be particularly close relatives of the family Heleomyzidae.

Description and ecology

Dung flies are small to minute, usually dull-colored flies with characteristically thickened first tarsomere of the posterior leg. The first tarsal segment is less than  times as long as the second tarsal segment and dilated. The crossvein separating the second basal and discal cells is missing. Veins four and five often fade apically. They occur all over the world except in regions with permanent ice-cover. Despite their ubiquity and abundance, little is known about their economic or ecological impact. Some species are known to be parthenogenetic.

Larval stages are poorly known, but those described are slender, narrowed anteriorly, with groups of ventral spicules on creeping welts. The larva is amphipneustic (having only the anterior and posterior pairs of spiracles). The mandibles are simple, hooked, and without additional teeth. The parastomal bars are long, thin structures, fused to the tentoropharyngeal sclerite. The hypopharyngeal sclerites are long separate or connected by a sclerotized bridge; the anterior spiracle (prothoracic spiracle)  is a rosette or branched. The posterior spiracles (on the anal segment)  are usually on two cylindrical lobes. Each spiracle has three slit or oval openings and three or five groups of interspiracular hairs that are branched in some species.

The larvae are microbial grazers found in abundance in many microenvironments with decomposing organic material. Most species appear to be associated with decaying plants or fungi and they are a part of the nutrient cycle. Some species, especially cave species, are polysaprophagous. Many species are associated with various kinds of faeces including human faeces; there are a few carrion-feeding species. These, however, are extremely abundant and are important components of the carrion-insect community. Sphaerocerids that abound in economically important decomposer communities such as compost and manure, and some decay cycles such as the wrack (seaweed) cycle are mediated by sphaerocerid-dominated insect communities.

As their microbe-associated habits suggest, sphaerocerids may carry many pathogenic microorganisms. Although their reclusive habits preclude a major role in disease transmission; some can present a public health hazard on occasion or act as a warning of one. For instance Leptocera caenosa and other sphaerocerids are associated with blocked sewage drains. Some species occasionally reach high population levels in food-processing plants and other buildings where they may indicate blocked drains, waste accumulation and inadequate hygiene. One species, Poecilosomella angulata, has been implicated in human intestinal myiasis They have been implicated as the major means by which nematodes are disseminated among mushroom houses. Sphaeoceridae often coexist with muscoids especially Fannia canicularis and Musca domestica in the complex manure ecosystem of poultry houses, and other confined-animal facilities. Here the sphaeocerids are prey for mites and beetles, which themselves also feed on the immatures of muscoid flies reducing the population of the more problematic muscoids. Carrion-feeding species are useful post mortem interval indicators in forensic entomology.

Genera
The genera are arranged alphabetically according to subfamily; these are arranged in the presumed phylogenetic sequence from the most ancestral to the most advanced:

Subfamily Tucminae Marshall, 1996

Subfamily Copromyzinae Stenhammar, 1855

Subfamily Sphaerocerinae Macquart, 1835

Subfamily Homalomitrinae Roháček & Marshall, 1998

Subfamily Limosininae Frey, 1921

See also
 Theodor Becker
 Oswald Duda
 Alexander Henry Haliday

Footnotes

References
  (2001): World Catalogue of Sphaeroceridae. Slezské zemské muzeum, Opava, Czech Republic.  PDF fulltext without images
K. G. V. Smith, 1989 An introduction to the immature stages of British Flies. Diptera Larvae, with notes on eggs, puparia and pupae.Handbooks for the Identification of British Insects Vol 10 Part 14. pdf  download manual (two parts Main text and figures index)

Further reading
 Oswald Duda,1938. 57. Sphaeroceridae (Cypselidae). In Lindner, E. (ed.): Die Fliegen der Paläarktischen Region  Vol.6, 182 pp., E. Schweizerbart.sche Verlagsbuchhandlung, Stuttgart.
 Scientific papers by Theodor Becker

 Pitkin, B.R. (1988). Lesser dung flies. Diptera: Sphaeroceridae. Handbooks for the Identification of British Insects 10(5e). London: Royal Entomological Society. 
 
 Rohácek, J. (1982-5). A monograph and reclassification of the previous genus Limosina Macquart (Diptera, Sphaeroceridae) of Europe, parts 1 to 4. Beitrage zur Entomologie
Eugene Seguy. 1934. Cypselidae. Faune de France volume 28, pp. 444–473. virtuelle numérique

External links

 Family description and images
 Page on Sphaeroceridae in houses
 Image Gallery from Dipter.info
 Picture of Leptocera limosa, a typical sphaerocerid
 Wing venation

Species lists
 European species list
 Nearctic species list
 Australasian/Oceanian species list
 Japanese species list
 World list

 
Brachycera families
Taxa named by Pierre-Justin-Marie Macquart
Articles containing video clips